Season of the Devil ( is a 2018 Filipino musical film directed by Lav Diaz. It was selected to compete for the Golden Bear in the main competition section at the 68th Berlin International Film Festival. It won the Grand Jury Prize for Film in the 2019 Filipino Academy of Movie Arts and Sciences (FAMAS) Awards. The film has a running time of 234 minutes.  It won Best Picture at the 58th International Film Festival of Cartagena de Indias, Gems Section.

Plot
Lorena (Shaina Magdayao) is a young doctor who opens a clinic for the poor in a remote Philippine village in the late 1970s. The village is controlled and terrorized by uniformed armed men, which the prologue of the film identifies as members of the Martial Law era Civilian Home Defense Forces.

Lorena disappears without a trace, prompting her husband Hugo (Piolo Pascual), an activist, poet, and teacher, to come looking for her. Hugo comes to the village and comes face to face with a community "shattered by despotism and violence."

Cast

Main cast
 Piolo Pascual as Hugo Haniway
 Shaina Magdayao as Lorena Haniway

Supporting cast
 Angel Aquino as Anghelita
 Pinky Amador as Kwago
 Bituin Escalante as Kwentista
 Hazel Orencio as Teniente 
 Bart Guingona as Paham
 Joel Saracho as Ahas

Reception

Critical reception

Variety praised the director for remaining "emphatically his own artist, whether to exhilarating or punishing effect," saying the movie has some "raw, stirring interludes." It however thought that Diaz's editing weakened the film's impact, saying "it’s hard not to wonder what finer rhythmic and tonal variations another editor… might have brought to the table this time."

The Hollywood Reporter called the film a "seething critique about the Philippines’ current trigger-happy president in the form of a 'rock opera.'"

Accolades
Season of the Devil won best film in the Gems section of 58th Festival Internacional de Cine Cartagena de Indias held in Colombia in March 2018.

The film led the 2019 FAMAS Awards with the most number of nominations, including nods for best picture and best director, and four for best supporting actress for Shaina Magdayao, Bituin Escalante, Pinky Amador, and Hazel Orencio. It won the award for best sound for sound designer Corinne de San Jose and was given the Grand Jury Prize for Film, an honor it shared with Whammy Alazaren's Never Tear Us Apart.

See also 
 List of films about martial law in the Philippines
 Civilian Home Defense Forces

References

External links
 

2018 films
2010s musical films
Philippine musical films
Filipino-language films
Films directed by Lav Diaz